Kuro no tenshi (The Black Angel) aka 黒の天使 may refer to two films:

Kuro no tenshi Vol. 1 (1997)
Kuro no tenshi Vol. 2 (1999)